Simon is a 2004 Dutch drama film directed by Eddy Terstall.
The story is about two male friends, one heterosexual and one gay. Same sex marriage and euthanasia are prominent themes of the film. The film has won three Golden Calves, for Best Actor (Cees Geel), Best Director (Eddy Terstall) and Best Feature Film, as well as the Audience Award (Eddy Terstall) of the Netherlands Film Festival. It was also the Dutch entry for the Oscars in 2005.

Plot

One of the characters is Camiel, a gay dentist who marries his lover and the other is Simon (Cees Geel), a heterosexual drugs dealer and lady magnet. They become close friends in the late 1980s, but Camiel does something that interrupts their friendship.

After fourteen years Camiel and Simon meet again, but Simon is now terminally ill with cancer.

Simon has a daughter, Joy (Nadja Hüpscher) and a son, Nelson (Stijn Koomen). They develop a friendship with Camiel and his husband and after Simon's death Camiel adopts them.

Cast
 Cees Geel as Simon Cohen
 Marcel Hensema as Camiel Vrolijk
 Rifka Lodeizen as Sharon
 Nadja Hüpscher as Joy
 Eva Duijvestein as Ellen
 Daan Ekkel as Marco
 Dirk Zeelenberg as Bram
 Stijn Koomen as Nelson
 Johnny de Mol as Floris (billed as Johnny de Mol jr.)
 Maria Kooistra as Gwen
 Femke Lakerveld as Adrienne
 Natasja Loturco as Astrid, Camiel's Assistant
 Araba Walton as Gisela
 Medi Broekman as Priscilla
 Dennis Rudge as Sjimmie
 Helena Remeijers as Djoeke
 Esmarel Gasman as Merjolein
 Wilhelmija Lamp as Alijt (billed as Willemijn Lamp)
 Klavertje Patijn as Liselot
 Ron Schuitemaker as Sjors (billed as Ron Schuitema)
 Jenayden Adriaan as Bruce
 Lisa Kuil as Samantha
 Laura Dozzelne as Joy - Age 7 (billed as Laura Dozzolne)
 Jeroen Willems as Huisarts
 Aaron Wan as Neurologist
 Howard van Dodemont as Traffic Cop
 Henk Kreekel as 2nd Opinion Arts
 Nico Huisman as Student
 Emmanuel K. Obinna as (Soldier #1) (billed as Emmanuel Obinna K)
 Troy Patterson as (Soldier #2)
 Matt Kosokoff as Director
 Pee Chantrarangsan as Thaise Man in Bar

Reception
Simon received positive reviews. On Rotten Tomatoes the film has an approval rating of 60% based on reviews from 5 critics. On Metacritic it has a score of 59 out of 100, based on reviews from 5 critics.

Jay Weissberg of Variety wrote: "Slick packaging and easy ensemble-playing can't mask hoary 'gather round, I'm dying' formula."

References

External links
 

2004 films
2004 drama films
Dutch LGBT-related films
2000s Dutch-language films
films about cancer
Films set in the Netherlands
Films directed by Eddy Terstall
LGBT-related drama films
Dutch drama films

2004 LGBT-related films